The SMKB (Smart-MK-Bomb) is a guidance kit that turns a standard Mk 82 (500 lbs) and Mk 83 (1.000 lbs) into a Precision-guided weapon, respectively called SMKB-82 and SMKB-83.

Development
In April 2009, AEQ and Mectron, defense division of Odebrecht Organisation, displayed at LAAD 2009 the first mock-up of a Brazilian precision guided weapons kit. Development of the SMKB was officially started in November 2009, and included a partnership with the Brazilian Air Force, through the "General Command of Aerospatial Technology" (Comando-Geral de Tecnologia Aeroespacial, CTA).

In the early stages of development, it was tested with GPS as the only satellite navigation network, however it is known that the U.S. (and other nations) have methods and devices to interfere with the satellite signal (jamming), thereby degrading weapon accuracy. In order to improve the resilience against jamming, it was decided to create a guide system, capable of operating with three satellite navigation networks: GPS (United States), Galileo (European Union) and GLONASS (Russia). The software coupled to the SMKB reads simultaneously and individually the three systems and assesses the positioning based on a verification algorithm, which provides greater reliability, because the data are crossed to allow correct positioning.  In addition, the company has developed anti-jamming capability with encrypted software which provides complete system integrity, also enhanced by the use of a highly directive radiation pattern.

Super Tucano aircraft were used during a 2 weeks long trials at which the first in-flight launch of the weapon took place in December 2010 at Natal Air Force Base. The SMKB-82 was cleared for use with the AMX, F-5, Kfir and Super Tucano by December 2012. Qualification test for SMKB-83 are scheduled to commence in 2013

Variants
SMKB-82 - Kit for Mk-82
SMKB-83 - Kit for Mk-83

See also
 FPG-82

Similar Weapons

 Joint Direct Attack Munition
 AASM
 Paveway IV
 HGK
 Spice
 Umbani
 LT PGB

References

External links
Mectron: Smart Weapons
AEQ: SMKB-82 - Wireless Systems (official brochure)

Aerial bombs of Brazil
Guided missiles of Brazil
Guided bombs